Gastrotheca atympana is a species of frog in the family Hemiphractidae. It is endemic to Peru and only known from its type locality in the Pampa Hermosa National Sanctuary, Junín Region.  It lacks an external tympanum, hence the specific name atympana.

Description
The holotype, an adult male, measured  in snout–vent length. External tympanum is lacking. The dorsum and flanks are pale gray. There are orange-brown markings with narrow, dark brown edges. The dorsal skin is finely shagreen. The iris is pale yellowish tan above and pale gray below and has black reticulations.

Habitat and conservation
It has been collected in dense forest on tree branches some 1.2 meters above the ground.

Gastrotheca atympana is only known from two individuals collected in 2003 and 2004, despite regular searches. Outside the Pampa Hermosa National Sanctuary, potential threats to this species are illegal logging, slash and burn agriculture, mining activities and road construction. There is a risk of these activities to encroach the reserve.

References

atympana
Amphibians of the Andes
Amphibians of Peru
Endemic fauna of Peru
Taxa named by William Edward Duellman
Amphibians described in 2004
Taxonomy articles created by Polbot